Bok van Blerk (born Louis Andreas Pepler; 30 March 1978) is a South African singer-songwriter who sings in Afrikaans. He became famous in 2006 for his rendition of "De la Rey" by Sean Else and Johan Vorster.

The Department of Arts and Culture denounced "De la Rey", as it could be inspiration for violent right-wing Afrikaner groups.

Early life and career 
Van Blerk went to school at Hoërskool Die Wilgers in Pretoria. After his study, he spent time working abroad.

In March 2006, Bok van Blerk and the Mossies released the album Jy praat nog steeds my taal (You still speak my language). The same album was rereleased in October 2006 under the name De La Rey and solely credited to Bok van Blerk. According to Van Blerk "and the Mossies" was removed because his fellow singer, Tanya van Graan, was too busy modelling. Van Blerk is accompanied by Jaco Mans (and occasionally Manie van Niekerk) on lead guitar, Francois Coetzee on bass guitar, and Nathan Smit on the drums.

"De la Rey" controversy 

On 6 February 2007, the South African Department of Arts and Culture issued a statement regarding the song "De la Rey" (which is a tribute to Koos de la Rey) regarding the controversy that arose due to the popularity of the song with some Afrikaners, who interpret the lyrics as a call to armed battle.

At some of his concerts some audience members have flown the old South African flag and the Transvaal Vierkleur. The Orange Free State flag is shown in the song's music video as part of the period scene depicted in the song and video. An article in Huisgenoot magazine challenged Minister Pallo Jordan to comment on the song and the message it is said to contain. In the statement the Department deplored the possibility that the song could be hijacked by right-wing circles, but wished the singer good luck. The Minister also stated that he has no problem with protests or mobilisation from the opposition, as long as they occur within the framework of the law.

Van Blerk himself says that he does not identify himself with the old South African flag, nor does he want to be associated with it. But he does promote Afrikaans and has refused to participate in the concert organised by the 94.7 Highveld Stereo radio station because of their policy not to play Afrikaans music.

He also makes it clear that he does not side with the Boeremag, that he does not believe violence to be a solution to problems and that General De la Rey was pro-peace. Koos Kombuis also points out that Van Blerk's rugby-song is about a coloured rugby player, Bryan Habana.

For the sake of his own survival, Bok was forced to print a disclaimer on the sleeve of his second album, Afrikanerhart; "Afrikanerhart is not a song that calls for any form of revolution or uprising. The song comes from the musical 'Ons vir Jou', and all that we want to say is that the Afrikaner also shed blood while building South Africa. If we respect all cultures and their history, we can together all make this country stronger". (Translated from the original Afrikaans)

Discography

Filmography
 Platteland (2011)
 As jy sing (2013)
 Vrou Soek Boer (2014)
 Leading Lady (2014)
 Blood & Glory (Modder en Bloed, 2018)

References

External links
 Bok van Blerk's homepage
 The Right Perspective interview (with YouTube video)
 Bok van Blerk's fanpage
 Alec Russell, "Boer Roar," Financial Times
 "Between Pride and Prejudice: The Problem of History", about van Blerk's De la Rey
 De la Rey music video from MK89 on YouTube
 Video interview with Bok van Blerk about "De la Rey" on Beeld webwerf
 Bok van Blerk's De la Rey on iTunes UK & Europe
 Bok van Blerk's De la Rey on iTunes USA

South African singer-songwriters
1978 births
Afrikaans-language singers
Afrikaner people
Living people
South African people of Dutch descent
21st-century South African male singers